The 1933–34 Panhellenic Championship was the sixth season of the highest football league of Greece. It was held in two groups, the Southern and the Northern.

The Southern Group was formed by 6 teams which resulted as follows:
Athenian Championship: The first 4 teams of the ranking.
Piraeus' Championship: The first 2 teams of the ranking.

The Northern Group was formed by 4 teams which resulted as follows:
Macedonian Championship: The first 4 teams of the ranking.

The winners of the 2 groups competed in a two-legged final. The national category, in which the clubs that did not qualify, competed in the regional championships, was abolished. So the clubs played first in the regional championships and then in the national category. Essentially, this arrangement was made to favor Panathinaikos, which had been relegated the previous year, after it had refused to participate in the ranking matches. The decision for the abolition of the National category was taken by the General Assembly of the HFF, which was held on September 23-24, 1933. Thus, PAOK returned to the first division, after a year of absence from the top division and staying in the Macedonian championship, due to demotion. The point system was: Win: 2 points - Draw: 1 point - Loss: 0 points.

Qualification round

Athens Football Clubs Association

Piraeus Football Clubs Association

Macedonia Football Clubs Association

Semi-final Round

Southern Group

Northern Group

Finals

|+Summary

|}

Matches

Olympiacos won 5–3 on aggregate.

Top scorers

References

External links
Rsssf, 1933–34 championship

Panhellenic Championship seasons
Greece
1